Frederick W. Kagan is an American resident scholar at the American Enterprise Institute (AEI) and a former professor of military history at the U.S. Military Academy at West Point.

Career

Both he and his father, Donald Kagan, who was a professor at Yale and a fellow at the Hudson Institute, authored While America Sleeps: Self-Delusion, Military Weakness, and the Threat to Peace Today (2000). The book argued in favor of a large increase in military spending and warned of future threats, including from a potential revival of Iraq's weapons of mass destruction program. Frederick and Robert Kagan, who is a member of the Aspen Strategy Group, and their father, Donald, were all signatories to the Project for the New American Century manifesto, Rebuilding America's Defenses (2000).

Influence 
Kagan authored the "real Iraq Study Group" report as the American Enterprise Institute's rival to the Iraq Study Group report of James Baker and Lee H. Hamilton in December 2006. The AEI report, Choosing Victory: A Plan for Success in Iraq, was released on January 5, 2007, and Kagan was said to have won over the ear of President George W. Bush, strongly influencing his subsequent "surge" plan for changing the course of the Iraq War. Along with retired General Jack Keane, retired Colonel Joel Armstrong, and retired Major Daniel Dwyer, Kagan is credited as one of the "intellectual architects" of the surge plan. According to Foreign Policy magazine, Kagan's essay "We're Not the Soviets in Afghanistan" influenced the strategic thinking of US Defense Secretary Robert Gates, which reportedly influenced Gates's decision to support sending 30,000 additional troops to Afghanistan.

Remarking on the surge in 2015, Kagan said that while the AEI group convened that "it never occurred to me or anybody that was involved in this that we were going to affect policy. It was simply 'Maybe we can put some concrete numbers on the table, some concrete enemy on a map, some concrete units on a grid, and force other people who want to have this discussion to wrestle with the specifics of the problem.'"

Advising David Petraeus
In 2010, U.S. Army General David H. Petraeus, who was appointed by President Barack Obama to head international forces in Afghanistan, hired Kagan as one of two experts on fighting corruption. An article in The Washington Post on December 19, 2012, discussed the relationship that the Kagans had with General Petraeus and, to a much lesser extent, with his successor in July 2011, General John R. Allen. It discussed various visits made by the Kagans from mid-2010, including their having been given access to the Combined Joint Intelligence Operations Center in Petraeus's headquarters. It commented on and raised questions about their sponsorship by Defense contractors through the American Enterprise Institute. It also detailed how the Kagans had become involved in Iraq in 2007 under an initiative by General Stanley A. McChrystal, who was their first introduction to Afghanistan in 2010.

2022 Russian invasion of Ukraine

Kagan has regularly contributed to daily reports by the Institute for the Study of War (ISW) on the 2022 Russian invasion of Ukraine.  The ISW was founded by his wife, Kimberly Kagan.

Bibliography
 
  edited with Robin D. S. Higham
  edited with Robin D. S. Higham
  edited with Christian Kubik
 
 
 with Thomas Donnelly
  edited with Thomas Donnelly

References

External links
 AEI profile 
 Rebuilding America's Defenses (2000)
 "PBS NewsHour": "As Violence Peaks and Dips, Debate Over 'Surge' Persists" (March 11, 2008)  Kagan, an architect of the Iraq "surge" strategy, debates the outcome of that strategy with journalist Nir Rosen.
 

1970 births
Living people
American people of Lithuanian-Jewish descent
American military historians
Jewish American historians
Yale University alumni
20th-century American non-fiction writers
21st-century American non-fiction writers
American Enterprise Institute
20th-century American male writers
American male non-fiction writers
21st-century American male writers
21st-century American Jews